Lee Young-jin (also stylized as Rie Young-zin; born February 24, 1981) is a South Korean model turned actress. She starred in the film Dear Dolphin.

Filmography

Film

Television series

Ambassadorship 
 Unobstructed Film Ambassadors (2023)

References

External links 

 
 
 
 

South Korean film actresses
South Korean television actresses
1981 births
Living people
20th-century South Korean actresses
21st-century South Korean actresses